Mehmet Al (born 11 July 1983) is a Turkish striker who plays for Sökespor. He studied at Ege University.

He played 10 times for Turkey Under 15 National Football Team and scored 1 goal.

He played 30 times for Turkey Under 16 National Football Team and scored 18 goals.

He played 15 times for Turkey Under 17 National Football Team and scored 8 goals.

He played 9 times for Turkey Under 18 National Football Team and scored 7 goals.

He played 6 times for Turkey Under 19 National Football Team and scored 3 goals.

He played 4 times for Turkey Under 20 National Football Team and scored 1 goal.

He played 3 times for Turkey Under 21 National Football Team and scored 0 goals.

References

External links

1983 births
Living people
Footballers from İzmir
Turkish footballers
Turkey under-21 international footballers
Turkey youth international footballers
Orduspor footballers
Bursaspor footballers
Kayseri Erciyesspor footballers
Çaykur Rizespor footballers
Balıkesirspor footballers
Ege University alumni
Süper Lig players
TFF First League players
Association football forwards